Euphorbia grandicornis, the cow's horn plant, is a succulent plant of the Euphorbiaceae or spurge family. It is native to the KwaZulu-Natal region of South Africa, to Mozambique, and to Eswatini.

The specific epithet "grandicornis" means "with large horns," and refers to the pairs of spines, which look like the horns of a bull.

Description 
Euphorbia grandicornis is a shrub with succulent, spiny stems that reaches a size of 0.5–2 m in height. Small leaves are formed between the spines but later drop off; the stems do the bulk of the photosynthesis. It is much branched from the base, with thorns, the branches 3-angled, erect or ascending, very deeply constricted in segments, subsagittate-ovate or reniform-sagittate, 5–13 cm long and 5 – 15 cm in diameter.

The fruit is showy and pops open when ripe.

It is found in dense dry mixed forest, on granite slopes, and on rocks, at an altitude of 40 to 700 meters.

Uses 
It is grown as a houseplant in temperate regions.

Chemical constituents of E. grandicornis have been studied for their use in cancer treatment.

References 

grandicornis